Matsubara Dam  is a dam in the Ōita Prefecture, Japan, completed in 1972.

References

Dams in Ōita Prefecture
Dams completed in 1972